Birks may refer to:

Businesses
 Birks Chemists, an historic pharmacy in Adelaide, South Australia
 Birks Group, a Canadian designer, manufacturer and retailer of jewellery, timepieces, silverware and gifts
 Charles Birks & Co, a former department store in Adelaide, South Australia

Other uses
 Birks (Lake District), England, UK; a fell in the English Lake District
 Birks (surname)

See also

 
 
 Birk (disambiguation)
 Birx (disambiguation)
 Berks (disambiguation)
 Burks (disambiguation)
 Burk (disambiguation)